Bisexual lighting is the simultaneous use of pink, purple, and blue lighting to represent bisexual characters. It has been used in studio lighting for film and television, as has been observed in the cinematography of various films. Whether the technique exists as a general phenomenon in filmmaking is disputed.

Some commentators have pointed to the pink and blue color scheme as merely a reference to 1980s aesthetic. It is reminiscent of neon lights and is also associated with retrowave.

Symbolism

George Pierpoint of BBC News writes that some social media users claim bisexual lighting has been used as an "empowering visual device" which counteracts perceived under-representation of bisexuality in the visual media. The colors may be a direct reference to the bisexual pride flag. The trend gained traction in the LGBT community in 2017 particularly on social media sites Twitter, Reddit, and Pinterest. Sasha Geffen wrote at Vulture.com that it had become "solid in its meaning", while Nicky Idika of PopBuzz wrote that it has now "become an established part of bisexual storytelling in media". And while The Daily Dot questioned whether "the aesthetic or the cultural significance [came] first", it too concluded that the idea "has stuck". Pantone selected "Ultra Violet" as the color of 2018 in a move the BBC says reflected the growing use of the scheme.

Amelia Perrin has criticized the trend of using such lighting when bisexual characters appear in television and music videos, arguing in Cosmopolitan that this visual image "perpetuates bisexual stereotypes". Perrin argues that this kind of lighting is usually produced by neon lights, which suggest "clubs and dancefloors" to the viewer, and this implies that "bisexual hook-ups and relationships are merely 'experiments', and something that only happens when you’re drunk on a night out."

According to Jessica Mason of The Mary Sue, the color purple—being a combination of multiple pure, spectral colors—has historically been used to represent "royalty and the divine," as well as "magic, aliens and the unknown."

Use in popular media

According to Pierpoint, the visual aesthetic may have been used as early as 2014 in the television series Sherlock, referencing the speculated hidden interests of Dr. Watson. The lighting has been used in numerous television and film media, typically in scenes featuring bisexual characters. The films The Neon Demon, Atomic Blonde, and Black Panther all feature the use of blue, pink, and purple lighting. Similarly, the award-winning Black Mirror episode "San Junipero", as well as an episodes from Blumhouse holiday horror anthology Into the Dark, including "I'm Just F*cking with You", "Midnight Kiss", and "My Valentine" made use of the visual aesthetic. Later, the television series Riverdale, Moonbeam City, The Assassination of Gianni Versace: American Crime Story, Voltron: Legendary Defender, and The Owl House, as well as the 2020 film Birds of Prey were also stated to be using it. The third episode of Loki, "Lamentis", features this lighting in a scene where the title character discloses his bisexuality.

Bisexual lighting also features in the music videos of Janelle Monáe's "Make Me Feel", Demi Lovato's "Cool for the Summer", Ariana Grande's "7 Rings" and Taylor Swift's "Lavender Haze". The term was used to describe the "electric blue and magenta pink lights" that flash during Harry Styles' song "Medicine" when he plays it on tour and in Lil Nas X's music video for "Panini". The presence of the lighting was proposed by Cosmopolitan as evidence to further fan theories of a bisexual reading of Taylor Swift's Lover first based on ambiguous lyrics.

Lara Thompson, a lecturer of film at Middlesex University, has argued that bisexual lighting is not well-known, stating: "I would have to see more examples before I see bisexual lighting as a wholly convincing phenomenon". According to Lillian Hochwender writing in Polygon, "Bi lighting often feels ubiquitous, even when there isn't a hint of bisexuality in sight... These are the colors of magic in fantasy, alien landscapes in sci-fi, and the neon lighting of cyberpunk settings and nightclubs. Thus, while Twitter users and media critics have noted bi lighting in John Wick 3, Blade Runner 2049,  Color Out of Space, Orphan: First Kill, Bingo Hell, Men in Black: International and Spider-Man: Into the Spider-Verse, there's often a less gay logic for doing so."

The use of bisexual lighting became a popular meme in 2018, with multiple Twitter threads showcasing instances of the lighting scheme going viral, as well as photographs of animals in bisexual lighting being shared widely on social media. In 2022, bisexual lighting was noticed in Netflix's Heartstopper and HBO's Emmy Award-winning Euphoria.

See also 

 Peak TV
 Vaporwave

References

External links
Bisexual Lighting: the Rise of Pink, Purple, and Blue - essay by Brows Held High's Kyle Kallgren

Lighting
Cinematic techniques
LGBT arts
LGBT culture
Stage lighting
2010s in film
2020s in film
2010s in television
2020s in television